Thomas Bagley may refer to:

Thomas Bagley (footballer) (fl. 1930s), English footballer
Thomas Bagley (priest) (died 1431), priest in England
Tom Bagley (born 1939), American former driver in the USAC and CART Championship Car series
 Tom Bagley (musician) (born 1965), Canadian musician